Unfold Yourself is the second solo album by Gomez singer and guitarist Ian Ball, released on May 31, 2013.

Track listing
"One More State" - 3:51
"Open Sesame" - 3:50
"Open Night" - 5:03
"Memory Test" - 3:55
"Clearer" - 3:51
"Living Longer" - 4:38
"Rocket Science" - 4:46
"Changer" - 3:58

References

2013 albums